Jan Doležal (born 12 February 1993) is a Croatian professional footballer who plays for Pegia as a forward.

Club career
Doležal spent his youth years with GNK Dinamo Zagreb Academy, and from 2006 with NK Hrvatski Dragovoljac, where he made his professional debut in 2011. Following three seasons with the club, in 2014 he moved to NK Lokomotiva. In January 2018 Doležal was signed by NK Slaven Belupo on a two-year deal. He had a 6-month spell with Austrian second tier-outfit SV Horn in 2020.

International career
Doležal was capped for Croatian U19 and U20 sides.

References

External links

1993 births
Living people
Footballers from Zagreb
Association football forwards
Croatian footballers
Croatia youth international footballers
NK Hrvatski Dragovoljac players
NK Lokomotiva Zagreb players
NK Slaven Belupo players
SV Horn players
Ethnikos Achna FC players
NK Rudeš players
Croatian Football League players
First Football League (Croatia) players
2. Liga (Austria) players
Cypriot First Division players
Croatian expatriate footballers
Expatriate footballers in Austria
Croatian expatriate sportspeople in Austria
Expatriate footballers in Cyprus
Croatian expatriate sportspeople in Cyprus